The 2015 Indian Open was a professional ranking snooker tournament that took place between 10 and 14 March 2015 at the Grand Hyatt in Mumbai, India. The tournament was originally scheduled for 13–17 October 2014, but was postponed until March due to the State Election in Maharashtra.

Mumbai played host to the tournament for the first time, having previously being held at the Le Meridien Hotel in New Delhi.

Ding Junhui was the defending champion, but he lost 3–4 against Thepchaiya Un-Nooh in the last 64.

Michael White  won his first ranking event by defeating Ricky Walden 5–0 in the final.

Prize fund
The breakdown of prize money for this year is shown below:

 Winner: £50,000
 Runner-up: £25,000
 Semi-final: £13,500
 Quarter-final: £9,000
 Last 16: £6,000
 Last 32: £3,000
 Last 64: £2,000

Wildcard round
These matches were played in Mumbai on 10 March 2015. The Indian wildcard players were selected through a qualifying tournament which was held at the PYC Hindu Gymkhana in Pune, India.

Main draw

Final

Qualifying
These matches were held on 12 and 13 February 2015 at the Barnsley Metrodome in Barnsley, England. The qualifiers were to take place between 18 and 21 September 2014, but were rescheduled as the ranking event was postponed. All matches were best of 7 frames.

Century breaks

Qualifying stage centuries

 133, 120  Kyren Wilson
 130  Tian Pengfei
 128  Thepchaiya Un-Nooh
 125  John Higgins
 124, 103  Ken Doherty
 124  Sam Baird
 122  Alan McManus
 109  Gerard Greene

 106  Anthony Hamilton
 104  Chris Norbury
 103  Mark King
 102  David Gilbert
 101  Gary Wilson
 101  Joe Swail
 101  Peter Ebdon
 100  Robin Hull

Televised stage centuries

 138  Stuart Carrington
 137, 123, 101  Thepchaiya Un-Nooh
 136  John Higgins
 127, 108, 106  Mark Williams
 126, 109, 100  Michael White
 119, 105  Kyren Wilson
 119, 102  Ding Junhui
 119  Ricky Walden

 112, 101  Luca Brecel
 109  Nigel Bond
 106  Tian Pengfei
 104  Judd Trump
 103  Matthew Selt
 101  Jamie Cope
 100  Ben Woollaston

References

2015
Indian Open
Open
Sports competitions in Mumbai
March 2015 sports events in India